Autovía A-26 is a long-term project of the Spanish government to upgrade the N-260 national road, also known as Eje Pirenaico (in Spanish) or Eix Pirenenc (in Catalan).

When finished, it will be the northernmost east-west highway in Spain and will connect the French border (near Portbou) with Sabiñánigo (northern Aragón), following the southern foothills of the eastern Pyrenees and passing over relevant towns such as Figueres, Olot, Ripoll, Puigcerdà or La Seu d'Urgell.

At the moment, there is only one section constructed between Besalú and Olot, both municipalities of the comarca of La Garrotxa (Catalonia, Spain), but a second section between Figueres and Besalú is about to be started shortly. The construction of a third section between Figueres and Llançà has been recently approved by the Spanish government.

See also

List of autopistas and autovías in Spain
List of primary highways in Catalonia

References
Opening of the section Besalú-Argelaguer 
News about the stage Figueres-Llançà 
Movement against the A-26 

Roads in Catalonia
Autopistas and autovías in Spain